is a railway station on the Sanriku Railway Company’s Rias Line located in the city of Miyako, Iwate Prefecture, Japan.

Lines
Sabane Station is served by the  Rias Line, and is located 101.1 rail kilometers from the terminus of the line at Sakari Station.

Station layout 
The station has a single side platform serving a single bi-directional track.  There is no station building, but only a rain shelter on the platform.

History 
Sabane Station opened on 27 February 1972 as a station on the Japan National Railways (JNR) Kuji Line. On 1 April 1984, upon the privatization of the Kuji Line, the station came under the control of the Sanriku Railway Company. However, the portion of the line from Miyako to Tarō resumed operations on 20 March 2011. Minami-Rias Line, a portion of Yamada Line, and Kita-Rias Line constitute Rias Line on 23 March 2019. Accordingly, this station became an intermediate station of Rias Line.

Adjacent stations

Passenger statistics
In fiscal 2015, the station was used by 3 passengers daily.

Surrounding area 
Tajiro River

See also
 List of railway stations in Japan

References

External links

  

Railway stations in Iwate Prefecture
Railway stations in Japan opened in 1972
Rias Line
Miyako, Iwate